Corey Antonio Hawkins (born October 22, 1988) is an American actor. He rose to prominence for his role in the TV series The Walking Dead (2015-2016), as well as his portrayal of Dr. Dre in the 2015 film Straight Outta Compton, the latter of which earned him nominations for a Screen Actors Guild Award, and a Critics' Choice Movie Award. In 2017, he starred in the Broadway production Six Degrees of Separation, for which he received a nomination for the Tony Award for Best Actor in a Play.

That same year, Hawkins starred in the Fox network series 24: Legacy (2017), along with Jordan Vogt-Roberts' monster film Kong: Skull Island. In 2018, he was featured in Spike Lee's biographical crime-comedy BlacKkKlansman, which earned him a nomination for a Screen Actors Guild Award. Hawkins received a nomination for the Primetime Emmy Award for Outstanding Actor in a Short Form Comedy or Drama Series, for his portrayal of Paul in the 2020 streaming series Survive.

His other roles include Michael Bay's action-comedy 6 Underground (2019), Jon M. Chu's musical film In the Heights (2021), and Joel Coen's 2021 historical thriller film The Tragedy of Macbeth. He is set to star in the 2023 film adaptation of The Color Purple.

Life and career
Hawkins was born in Washington, D.C., where he was raised by his mother, a police officer. He attended the Duke Ellington School of the Arts, and graduated from the Juilliard School in New York City, a member of the drama division's "Group 40". While studying at Juilliard, Hawkins received the prestigious John Houseman Award for excellence in classical theatre. Upon graduation, he began a career starring Off-Broadway and guest-starring on television. Hawkins garnered a brief role in Marvel Studios' Iron Man 3 and went on to star opposite Liam Neeson and Julianne Moore in Universal Pictures' action-thriller Non-Stop.

In 2013, Hawkins made his Broadway debut as Tybalt in the revival of William Shakespeare's Romeo and Juliet. In 2015, The Hollywood Reporter announced that Hawkins would join the cast of AMC's The Walking Dead as Heath, a key character from Robert Kirkman's comic series. Hawkins played Dr. Dre in the biopic Straight Outta Compton, from Universal Pictures, which was theatrically released on August 14, 2015, and grossed $201 million at the box office.

In 2017, Hawkins began playing a lead role in the 24 reboot 24: Legacy on Fox. Also that year, he co-starred in the film Kong: Skull Island, alongside Brie Larson, Samuel L. Jackson and Tom Hiddleston. In spring 2017, Hawkins played a limited-engagement run on Broadway in the play Six Degrees of Separation opposite Allison Janney and John Benjamin Hickey. He received a nomination for the Tony Award for Best Actor in a Play.

Hawkins performed "God Bless America" for the men's singles final at the 2017 U.S. Open.

Filmography

Film

Television

Theater

Awards and nominations

References

External links

 
https://www.ibdb.com/broadway-cast-staff/corey-hawkins-494991

1988 births
Living people
21st-century American male actors
African-American male actors
American male film actors
American male stage actors
American male television actors
Juilliard School alumni
Male actors from Washington, D.C.
21st-century African-American people
20th-century African-American people